Michael Bradley (born 1994) is an Irish hurler who plays for Antrim Senior Championship club St. John's and at inter-county level with the Antrim senior hurling team. He usually lines out as a midfielder or at wing-forward.

Career

A member of the St. John's club in Belfast, Bradley first appeared on the inter-county scene as a member of the Antrim minor team during the 2012 Ulster Minor Championship. He later won consecutive Ulster Under-21 Championship titles and came on as a substitute in Antrim's 2013 All-Ireland final defeat by Clare. Bradley joined the Antrim senior hurling team straight out of the minor grade and won two Ulster Championship titles over the following few years before leaving the team. He was recalled to the team shortly afterwards and was at midfield for Antrim's 2020 Joe McDonagh Cup triumph.

Honours

Antrim
Ulster Senior Hurling Championship: 2013, 2014
Joe McDonagh Cup: 2020
National Hurling League Division 2A: 2020
Ulster Under-21 Hurling Championship: 2013, 2014

References

External links
Michael Bradley profile at the Antrim GAA website

1994 births
Living people
Antrim inter-county hurlers
Irish firefighters